At 57 km2, Blöndulón is one of Iceland's largest lakes. It was created in 1984-1991 as a reservoir for the Blönduvirkjun  power plant, and has a depth of 39 m.

It is situated near the Kjölur highland road in the Highlands of Iceland.  The hot springs of Hveravellir are situated some 25 km to the south.

See also
List of lakes of Iceland

References 

Lakes of Iceland